Shemord Thompson (born 15 January 1987) is a Bahamian footballer who plays as a defender for BFA Senior League side Bears. He earned eight caps for the Bahamas national team between 2006 and 2011.

Club career
Thompson played college soccer in the United States for Rogers State University, joining the Hillcats in 2007.

International career
Thompson played for the Bahamas U-15, U-17, U-20 and U-21 teams and made his debut for the senior Bahamas in a September 2006 Caribbean Cup qualification match against the Cayman Islands, coming off the sub's bench to also score his first international goal. He had earned 6 caps by November 2008, 3 of them in World Cup qualification games.

References

External links
 Rogers State Hillcats bio
 
 

1987 births
Living people
Bahamian footballers
Bahamas international footballers
Bahamas under-20 international footballers
Bahamas youth international footballers
Association football defenders
Rogers State Hillcats men's soccer players
Bears FC players
Bahamian expatriate footballers
Bahamian expatriate sportspeople in the United States
Expatriate soccer players in the United States
Sportspeople from Nassau, Bahamas